The Chip-Chip Gatherers is a novel by Shiva Naipaul originally published in 1973 by Andre Deutsch. It was reprinted in a new edition as a Penguin Twentieth Century Classic in 1997. It is a comic story following a cast of colourful Hindu and Muslim characters of Indian descent in a large village in Trinidad. It won the Whitbread Award.

1973 novels
Novels set in Trinidad and Tobago
André Deutsch books